The Shelby County Athletic League is an OHSAA athletic conference whose seven members are located in Shelby County, Ohio.

Members

Former members
 Plattsville Green Township Griffins (pre-1940-51, consolidated into Fairlawn)
 McCartyville Mustangs (pre-1940-49, consolidated into Anna)
 Pemberton Perry Township Panthers (pre-1940-51, consolidated into Fairlawn)

See also

Ohio High School Athletic Conferences

High school sports in Ohio
Shelby County, Ohio